Winston Razel Ceesay (born 10 August 2000) is a Sierra Leonean professional footballer who plays as a midfielder for Serie D club Brindisi and the Sierra Leone national team.

Club career
Ceesay started his senior team career with Italian Serie D club Troina in 2018–19 season. He joined Licata following season, where he found regular playing time. In January 2020, Serie C club Siena signed Ceesay on a permanent deal. However, the league got halted within next few weeks due to COVID-19 pandemic in Italy and he left the club without making any appearance for them.

On 12 November 2020, Lucchese announced the signing of Ceesay on a short term deal until the end of the season. He made his Serie C and professional debut on 15 November 2020 in a 1–1 draw against Pro Sesto. He was released by the club on 1 February 2021 after making seven league appearances.

On 29 March 2021, Serie D club Rotonda announced the signing of Ceesay. On 18 July 2022, he moved to Trapani. However, he couldn't find enough playing time at Trapani and joined fellow Serie D club Brindisi in December 2022.

International career
In March 2022, Ceesay received his first call-up to Sierra Leone national team for friendly matches against Togo, Liberia and Congo. He made his international debut on 29 March 2022 in a 2–1 win against Congo.

Career statistics

International

References

External links
 

2000 births
Living people
Sportspeople from Freetown
Association football midfielders
Sierra Leonean footballers
Sierra Leone international footballers
Serie C players
Serie D players
S.S.D. Lucchese 1905 players
Sierra Leonean expatriate footballers
Sierra Leonean expatriate sportspeople in Italy
Expatriate footballers in Italy